Aspro may refer to:

ASPRO chronology, a dating system of the ancient Near East used for archaeological sites (Atlas des sites du Proche-Orient)
Aspro, a Bayer brand name for aspirin, a drug also known as acetylsalicylic acid
Aspro, a contract bridge bidding convention; see also Astro and Asptro
Associate professor
The aspro (Zingel asper), also known as the "Rhone streber" or "asper", a member of the fish genus Zingel
, the name of more than one United States Navy ship
Aspro Parks, a Spanish leisure corporation that operates many aquatic-themed parks and public aquaria across Europe